Jõhvi is a town in northeastern Estonia, and the administrative centre of the Ida-Viru County. The town is also an administrative centre of Jõhvi Parish. It is situated about 50 km west of the Estonia–Russia international border.

History
Jõhvi was first mentioned as a village in 1241 in Liber Census Daniae when it was ruled by Denmark. Historical names of Jõhvi were Gewi and Jewe. In the 13th century a church was built there and Jõhvi became the centre of the local church parish.

On 1 May 1938, the government of Estonia upgraded the official status of Jõhvi from "borough" to that of an independent "town". During the period of Soviet occupation (1944–1991), Jõhvi was administratively not a town, but a district of the city of Kohtla-Järve. In 2005, the town of Jõhvi was united with the parish of Jõhvi. 

During the period of the Soviet occupation, large numbers of immigrant workers from Russia and other parts of the former USSR were brought in to populate the rapidly growing city of Kohtla-Järve, including the then district of Jõhvi. The population in the Jõhvi area which had been, as of 1934 census, over 90% ethnic Estonian, became overwhelmingly non-Estonian in the second half of the 20th century. According to more recent data, about 55% of the town's population are ethnic Russians.

Population
Jõhvi population by year

 the year 1917. 1,300 people
 on April 1, 1938. 2525 people
 on January 1, 1999 12,922 ;
 the year 2000. 12,112 people  of whom 6,482 (53.5%) were Russians and 4,022 (33.2%) Estonians;
 the year 2003. 11,743 people
 the year 2005. 11,533 people
 According to the 2011 census, 10,775 people of whom 3,718 (34.5%) are Estonians and 6,004 (55.7%) are Russians. 
 According to the 2021 census, 10,482 people of whom 3,635 (34.7%) are Estonians and 5,797 (55.3%) are Russians.

Climate

Gallery

References

External links

 
Cities and towns in Estonia
Former municipalities of Estonia
Kreis Wierland